A Thousand Melodies is a 1956 West German musical film directed by Hans Deppe and starring Martin Benrath, Gardy Granass and Helmuth Schneider.

The film was shot at the Tempelhof Studios in West Berlin with sets designed by the art directors Willi Herrmann and Heinrich Weidemann.

Cast
 Martin Benrath as Martin Hoff
 Gardy Granass as Barbara Hoff
 Helmuth Schneider as Thomas Hoff
 Bibi Johns as Irina Servi
 Heli Finkenzeller as Tante Dele
 Paul Henckels as Pasedack, Oberbuchhalter
 Anneliese Würtz as Mutter Hoff
 Ernst Waldow as Ernst Lauterbach
 Käthe Itter as Elisabeth Lauterbach
 Michael Chevalier as Felix Riemann
 Horst Gentzen as Albert Förster
 Ralf Wolter as Hugo Pähler
 Herbert Hübner as Hagebutt
 Erich Fiedler as Konzertagent Heimroth
 Kurt Klüsner as Schnauf
 Peter Cornehlsen
 Das Cornell-Trio as Sänger
 Edith Hancke
 Horst Kraft
 Michael Lengauer
 Heinz Petruo

References

Bibliography 
Lutz Peter Koepnick. The Cosmopolitan Screen: German Cinema and the Global Imaginary, 1945 to the Present. University of Michigan Press, 2007.

External links 
 

1956 films
West German films
German musical films
1956 musical films
1950s German-language films
Films directed by Hans Deppe
Films about music and musicians
Films shot at Tempelhof Studios
1950s German films